Andijk is a former municipality and a village bordering Lake IJssel in the Netherlands, in the province of North Holland and the region of West-Frisia. Since 1 January 2011 Andijk has been part of Medemblik municipality.

In 1667, a small church was built. During the French Napoleonic occupation, Andijk became an independent municipality on 1 January 1812 by imperial decree of 21 October 1811.

Andijk has fertile clay soil used for with agriculture and vegetable horticulture. Andijk is also an important supplier of drinking water for the region.
A  test polder, which was built in the Zuiderzee in 1926–1927 as a test run for the construction of the Wieringermeer polder, is located at Andijk. The polder is used for recreation, and has facilities for overnight stays, such as several camp-sites, two hunting points, and a beach.

Local government
The last municipal council of Andijk had 13 seats, which were divided as follows:

 CDA – 4 seats
 PvdA – 3 seats
 VVD – 3 seats
 GroenLinks – 2 seats
 ChristenUnie – 1 seat

Public transport
Bus service 132 operates hourly through Andijk at roughly xx.30 each hour during the day. It connects to train services at Hoorn NS (Hoorn railway station), and the journey which takes 45 minutes.

Test polder
Now, this area serves as a residential area. This polder is significant for the city: it is cited in its anthem.

News
De Andijker  has been the local newspaper since 1921, and can also be read on the Internet. It includes daily news and (historical) photos of the village and its inhabitants.

Notable people
 Bep Vriend, international bridge player, born 1946 in Andijk

References

 Statistics are taken from the SDU Staatscourant

 
 

Municipalities of the Netherlands disestablished in 2011
Populated places in North Holland
Former municipalities of North Holland
Medemblik